The list of mammals of Iraq comprises seventy-eight mammal species, of which one is endangered, eleven are vulnerable, and three are near threatened. One of the species is probably locally extinct in the wild.

The following tags are used to highlight each species' conservation status as assessed on the IUCN Red List:

Order: Artiodactyla (even-toed ungulates) 

The even-toed ungulates are ungulates whose weight is borne about equally by the third and fourth toes, rather than mostly or entirely by the third as in perissodactyls. There are about 220 artiodactyl species, including many that are of great economic importance to humans.
Family: Bovidae (cattle, antelope, sheep, goats)
Subfamily: Antilopinae
Genus: Gazella
Arabian sand gazelle, G. marica 
Goitered gazelle, G. subgutturosa  presence uncertain
Subfamily: Caprinae
Genus: Capra
Wild goat, C. aegagrus 
Genus: Ovis
Mouflon, O. gmelini 
Family: Cervidae (deer)
Subfamily: Capreolinae
Genus: Capreolus
Roe deer, C. capreolus 
Subfamily: Cervinae
Genus: Cervus
Red deer, C. elaphus 
Family: Suidae (pigs)
Genus: Sus
Wild boar, S. scrofa

Order: Carnivora 

There are over 260 species of carnivorans, the majority of which feed primarily on meat. They have a characteristic skull shape and dentition. 
Suborder: Feliformia
Family: Felidae (cats)
Subfamily: Felinae
Genus: Caracal
Caracal, C. caracal 
Genus: Felis
Jungle cat, F. chaus 
African wildcat, F. lybica 
Sand cat, F. margarita 
Genus: Lynx
Eurasian lynx, L. lynx 
Subfamily: Pantherinae
Genus: Panthera
 Leopard, P. pardus 
Panthera pardus tulliana 
Family: Hyaenidae
Genus: Hyaena
Striped hyena, H. hyaena 
Family: Herpestidae (mongooses)
Genus: Urva
Small Indian mongoose, U. auropunctata 
Suborder: Caniformia
Family: Canidae
Genus: Canis
Golden jackal, C. aureus 
 Persian jackal, C. a. aureus
 Syrian jackal, C. a. syriacus
Gray wolf, C. lupus 
 Arabian wolf, C. l. arabs
Genus: Vulpes
Rüppell's fox, V. rueppellii 
Red fox, V. vulpes 
Family: Ursidae (bears)
Genus: Ursus
Brown bear, U. arctos 
 Syrian brown bear, U. a. syriacus 
Family: Mustelidae
Genus: Lutra
Eurasian otter, L. lutra 
Genus: Lutrogale
Smooth-coated otter, L. perspicillata 
Genus: Martes
European pine marten, M. martes 
Genus: Meles
Caucasian badger, M. canescens 
Genus: Mellivora
Honey badger, M. capensis 
Genus: Vormela
Marbled polecat, V. peregusna

Order: Cetacea (whales) 

The order Cetacea includes whales, dolphins and porpoises. They are the mammals most fully adapted to aquatic life with a spindle-shaped nearly hairless body, protected by a thick layer of blubber, and forelimbs and tail modified to provide propulsion underwater.
Suborder: Mysticeti
Family: Balaenopteridae
Subfamily: Balaenopterinae
Genus: Balaenoptera
 Bryde's whale, B. edeni 
Subfamily: Megapterinae
Genus: Megaptera
 Humpback whale, M. novaeangliae 
Suborder: Odontoceti
Superfamily: Platanistoidea
Family: Phocoenidae
Genus: Neophocaena
 Finless porpoise, N. phocaenoides 
Family: Delphinidae (marine dolphins)
Genus: Grampus
 Risso's dolphin, G. griseus 
Genus: Pseudorca
 False killer whale, P. crassidens 
Genus: Sousa
 Indo-Pacific humpback dolphin, S. chinensis

Order: Chiroptera (bats) 

The bats' most distinguishing feature is that their forelimbs are developed as wings, making them the only mammals capable of flight. Bat species account for about 20% of all mammals.
Family: Vespertilionidae
Subfamily: Myotinae
Genus: Myotis
Lesser mouse-eared bat, M. blythii 
Long-fingered bat, M. capaccinii 
Natterer's bat, M. nattereri 
Subfamily: Vespertilioninae
Genus: Eptesicus
 Botta's serotine, E. bottae 
 Northern bat, E. nilssoni 
Genus: Otonycteris
 Desert long-eared bat, O. hemprichii 
Genus: Pipistrellus
 Kuhl's pipistrelle, P. kuhlii 
 Rüppell's pipistrelle, P. rueppelli 
Genus: Rhyneptesicus
Sind bat, R. nasutus 
Subfamily: Miniopterinae
Genus: Miniopterus
Common bent-wing bat, M. schreibersii 
Family: Rhinopomatidae
Genus: Rhinopoma
 Lesser mouse-tailed bat, R. hardwickei 
 Greater mouse-tailed bat, R. microphyllum 
Family: Molossidae
Genus: Tadarida
European free-tailed bat, T. teniotis 
Family: Rhinolophidae
Subfamily: Rhinolophinae
Genus: Rhinolophus
Mediterranean horseshoe bat, R. euryale 
Greater horseshoe bat, R. ferrumequinum 
Lesser horseshoe bat, R. hipposideros 
Mehely's horseshoe bat, R. mehelyi

Order: Erinaceomorpha (hedgehogs and gymnures) 

The order Erinaceomorpha contains a single family, Erinaceidae, which comprise the hedgehogs and gymnures. The hedgehogs are easily recognised by their spines while gymnures look more like large rats.
Family: Erinaceidae (hedgehogs)
Subfamily: Erinaceinae
Genus: Hemiechinus
 Long-eared hedgehog, H. auritus 
Genus: Paraechinus
 Desert hedgehog, P. aethiopicus

Order: Lagomorpha (lagomorphs) 

The lagomorphs comprise two families, Leporidae (hares and rabbits), and Ochotonidae (pikas). Though they can resemble rodents, and were classified as a superfamily in that order until the early 20th century, they have since been considered a separate order. They differ from rodents in a number of physical characteristics, such as having four incisors in the upper jaw rather than two.
Family: Leporidae (rabbits, hares)
Genus: Lepus
Cape hare, L. capensis 
European hare, L. europaeus

Order: Rodentia 

Rodents make up the largest order of mammals, with over 40% of mammalian species. They have two incisors in the upper and lower jaw which grow continually and must be kept short by gnawing.
Suborder: Sciurognathi
Family: Sciuridae (squirrels)
Subfamily: Sciurinae
Tribe: Sciurini
Genus: Sciurus
 Caucasian squirrel, S. anomalus
Family: Gliridae (dormice)
Subfamily: Leithiinae
Genus: Dryomys
 Forest dormouse, Dryomys nitedula
Genus: Eliomys
Asian garden dormouse, E. melanurus 
Family: Dipodidae (jerboas)
Subfamily: Allactaginae
Genus: Allactaga
 Euphrates jerboa, Allactaga euphratica
Family: Spalacidae
Subfamily: Spalacinae
Genus: Nannospalax
 Palestine mole rat, Nannospalax ehrenbergi LC
Family: Cricetidae
Subfamily: Cricetinae
Genus: Cricetulus
 Grey dwarf hamster, Cricetulus migratorius
Genus: Mesocricetus
 Turkish hamster, Mesocricetus brandti
Subfamily: Arvicolinae
Genus: Microtus
 Günther's vole, Microtus guentheri
 Persian vole, Microtus irani
Family: Muridae (mice, rats, voles, gerbils, hamsters)
Subfamily: Deomyinae
Genus: Acomys
 Cairo spiny mouse, Acomys cahirinus LC
Subfamily: Gerbillinae
Genus: Gerbillus
 Cheesman's gerbil, Gerbillus cheesmani
 Wagner's gerbil, Gerbillus dasyurus
 Gerbillus mesopotamiae
 Gerbillus nanus LC
Genus: Meriones
 Sundevall's jird, Meriones crassus LC
 Libyan jird, Meriones libycus LC
 Persian jird, Meriones persicus
 Tristram's jird, Meriones tristrami
Genus: Tatera
 Indian gerbil, Tatera indica
Subfamily: Murinae
Genus: Apodemus
 Persian field mouse, Apodemus arianus
 Broad-toothed field mouse, Apodemus mystacinus
 Black Sea field mouse, Apodemus ponticus
Genus: Nesokia
 Bunn's short-tailed bandicoot rat, Nesokia bunnii
 Short-tailed bandicoot rat, Nesokia indica LC

Order: Sirenia (manatees and dugongs) 

Sirenia is an order of fully aquatic, herbivorous mammals that inhabit rivers, estuaries, coastal marine waters, swamps, and marine wetlands. All four species are endangered.
Family: Dugongidae
Genus: Dugong
Dugong, D. dugon

Order: Soricomorpha (shrews, moles, and solenodons) 

The "shrew-forms" are insectivorous mammals. The shrews and solenodons closely resemble mice while the moles are stout-bodied burrowers.
Family: Soricidae (shrews)
Subfamily: Crocidurinae
Genus: Crocidura
 Bicolored shrew, C. leucodon 
Lesser white-toothed shrew, C. suaveolens

Locally extinct 
The following species are locally extinct in the country:
 Cheetah, Acinonyx jubatus
 European bison, Bison bonasus
 Eurasian beaver, Castor fiber
 Persian fallow deer, Dama mesopotamica
 Onager, Equus hemionus
 Arabian oryx, Oryx leucoryx
 Lion, Panthera leo
 Tiger, Panthera tigris

See also
List of chordate orders
Lists of mammals by region
Mammal classification
Wildlife of Iraq

References

External links

Iraq
Iraq
Mammals
Mammals